One Nation Under is the debut album by the Chicago-based nu metal music group From Zero. The album was released on May 15, 2001 via Arista Records. The songs "Check Ya" and "Erase" received a good deal of radio airtime on rock stations in the midwest. As well, the video for "Check Ya" received moderate rotation on the short lived MTV-X channel. However, neither song gained nationwide hit status.

Track listing

Personnel
Jett – vocals
Joe Pettinato – lead guitar 
Pete Capizzi – rhythm guitar, backing vocals
Rob Likey – bass, backing vocals
Kid – drums
 David bianco - producer, mixing, engineering, mastering

References

2001 debut albums
From Zero albums
Arista Records albums